Jeotgalibaca dankookensis is a Gram-positive, aerobic, halotolerant and non-motile bacterium from the genus Jeotgalibaca which has been isolated from Saeu-jeot.

References

Lactobacillales
Bacteria described in 2014